Deimos, a Greek word for dread, may refer to:

 Deimos (deity), one of the sons of Ares and Aphrodite in Greek mythology
 Deimos (moon), the smaller and outermost of Mars' two natural satellites
 Elecnor Deimos, a Spanish aerospace company
 Deimos-1, an artificial Earth observation satellite
 Deimos-2, an artificial Earth observation satellite
 Deimos (launch platform), a floating launch platform currently in refit by SpaceX
 Deimos (comics), villain for the Warlord comic series
 DEIMOS, an early message passing OS for the Cray-1, replaced by the Cray Time Sharing System
 Deimos (Doctor Who audio), an audio drama
 Deimos, the brother of Kratos in the God of War series
 USS Deimos (AK-78), a ship in the US Navy in World War II
 Deimos, the identity of an antagonistic character from the 2018 video game Assassin's Creed Odyssey

See also
 Demoz (disambiguation)